Pietro Antonio Loro Piana (Trivero, 6 September 1883 – 1941), founder of the textile company Loro Piana, was an Italian engineer and entrepreneur.

Son of Giacomo Loro Piana and Clementina Zignone, still young he moved with his parents to Valsesia from the native Trivero; here Loro Piana brought the Biella tradition of making wool that his family cultivated for decades. In Quarona, right in the heart of the textile area of the Province of Vercelli where he works and resides, founded the Lanificio Fratelli Lora e Compagnia, followed by Lanificio di Quarona di Zignone & C..

It was at that time that Pietro single-handedly started a new venture that would be more forward-thinking. This is how "Ing. Loro Piana & C." was started in Corso Rolandi, now the corporate headquarters of the company. Great supporter of engineering development applied to production process and to all technological innovation of the product, on 24 April 1924 founded the company "Ing Loro Piana & Co.", which later became the current Loro Piana SpA, giant of Italian fashion and among the largest companies in the world producing clothing in cashmere wool. Loro Piana died in 1941.

See also 
 Loro Piana
 Cashmere wool

References

External links 
 Official Website

20th-century Italian engineers
1883 births
1941 deaths
Loro Piana
People from Trivero
People from Quarona